Wired All Wrong is a nu metal band formed by musician/producers Matt Mahaffey of Self and Jeff Turzo previously of God Lives Underwater. The two have been longtime friends since a mix-up of their bands on MTV. Partly due to the unfortunate deaths of David Reilly from GLU and Mike Mahaffey from Self, Matt and Jeff were able to shift their attention away from their other bands. Their debut album, Break out the Battle Tapes, came out on September 12, 2006.

Break out the Battle Tapes
Wired All Wrong released their first LP, Break out the Battle Tapes, on September 12, 2006 which features the singles "Lost Angeles," "Nothing at All" and "Elevatin". The song "You're Freakin' Me out Girl" features rapper Count Bass D.

The band went on tour in the fall of 2006 to promote the album. A notable performance was at LA Weekly's Detour Festival.

The band had a contest for their fans to make the music video for "Nothing at All."

Live performances
Wired All Wrong has been described as functioning similar to God Lives Underwater, Turzo's former band, in the sense that the two founding members, Turzo and Mahaffey, write, record and produce all the music then perform it live alongside a full band. Their on-stage presence is that of an over-the-top, garage-band-esque, heavy metal sound accented by Mahaffey's light-hearted stage antics. 

Wired All Wrong performed and recorded a remix of their hit song "Lost Angeles" live at radio station Indie 103. An mp3 of what has been dubbed the "Super Funky Fresh Mix" of the song is available on the band's MySpace.com page in a blog from September 25, 2006.

Producers
The duo produced for the band Hellogoodbye on their debut album Zombies! Aliens! Vampires! Dinosaurs!. They also produced 4 tracks for the band Forever the Sickest Kids on their debut album Underdog Alma Mater. They produced two tracks on The Sounds' third album Crossing the Rubicon as well as the entire 2008 album Walk This Way by The White Tie Affair.

Albums
Break out the Battle Tapes (2006)

References

External links
 Wired All Wrong Official Site
 Nitrus Records' WAW Site
 MySpace Profile
 Matt's MySpace Page
 WAW Interview
 [ AllMusic.com's WAW Page]

Rock music groups from California